Dobrun is a rural locality (a settlement) in Sevsky District, Bryansk Oblast, Russia. The population was 104 as of 2013. There are 2 streets.

Geography 
Dobrun is located 17 km north of Sevsk (the district's administrative centre) by road. Zaulye is the nearest rural locality.

References 

Rural localities in Sevsky District